WRBS-FM (95.1 MHz, "Bright-FM") is a radio station in Baltimore, Maryland, serving the Baltimore metropolitan area. The station broadcasts a contemporary Christian radio format and is owned by Peter & John Radio Fellowship, Inc.

WRBS-FM has an effective radiated power (ERP) of 50,000 watts, the maximum permitted for non-grandfathered FM stations in this region.  Its studios and transmitter are co-located off Commerce Drive near Interstate 95 in Halethorpe, Maryland, using a Baltimore address.  WRBS-FM broadcasts using HD Radio technology.  The HD2 digital subchannel carries an alternate Christian Contemporary format known as "Positive Hits."  The HD3 subchannel rebroadcasts the Christian talk and teaching programs heard on co-owned WRBS (1230 AM).

History

Peter & John Fellowship
In 1948, three young ministers Peter and John Bisset, and Paul Plack, created "The Peter, Paul and John Broadcast" to reach non-church goers during the week on WFBR (1300 AM), then one of Baltimore's most popular radio stations. The Bisset's were the youngest of five brothers whose family had emigrated from Scotland. Paul Plack was a singer who had met the brothers during his evangelistic tours.

Paul left the broadcast in 1952, and the program was renamed "The Peter and John Broadcast."  The brothers continued to host the show until Peter's sudden death of a heart attack in 1995.

WRBS early years
On June 30, 1960, the station first signed on the air.  It was owned by John B. Reynolds, who served as the general manager and commercial manager.  The call sign WRBS was chosen to represent Reynolds Broadcasting Service.

At the time, it carried a classical music format, when few people owned FM receivers. It didn't have an FM suffix because Reynolds did not own an AM sister station.  The FM station stood alone.

Christian radio
In 1964, Peter & John Radio Fellowship acquired WRBS.  The brothers upgraded WRBS's facilities in 1972.  The station increased power to 50,000 watts, from 20,000 watts.  It began broadcasting 24 hours daily coupled with a move from East Cold Spring Lane in Baltimore to its present site at 3500 Commerce Drive.

In 2006, Peter and John Radio Fellowship, Inc., acquired a Baltimore AM radio station, the former WITH (1230 AM) and changed its call sign to WRBS. The FM station is now licensed under the call letters WRBS-FM, using the FM suffix to distinguish it from WRBS 1230 AM.

In August 2009, WRBS-FM was re-branded to feature contemporary Christian music, and began calling itself 95.1 Shine FM.

On May 2, 2022, WRBS-FM rebranded as Bright-FM, after Olivet Nazarene University withdrew its license to use the Shine FM name.

On February 11, 2023, WRBS-FM began rebroadcasting on the 103.1 FM frequency previously occupied by Adult album alternative station WRNR-FM, which it brought from them back in November. After the switch, its calls was changed to WRHS, with the station's city of license of Grasonville being retained.

Previous logo

References

External links

RBS-FM
Contemporary Christian radio stations in the United States
RBS-FM
Moody Radio affiliate stations
Radio stations established in 1960
1960 establishments in Maryland